Honduras competed in the 2019 Pan American Games in Lima, Peru from July 26 to August 11, 2019.

In July 2019, the Honduran Olympic Committee released a full list of 44 athletes (32 men and 12 women) competing in 14 sports.

During the opening ceremony of the games, equestrian athlete Pedro Espinosa carried the flag of the country as part of the parade of nations.

Competitors
The following is the list of number of competitors (per gender) participating at the games per sport/discipline.

Medalists
The following competitors from Honduras won medals at the games. In the by discipline sections below, medalists' names are bolded.

|  style="text-align:left; vertical-align:top;"|

|  style="text-align:left; width:22%; vertical-align:top;"|

Athletics (track and field)

Honduras entered one male athlete.

Key
Note–Ranks given for track events are for the entire round

Men
Field event

Bodybuilding

Honduras qualified a full team of two bodybuilders (one male and one female).

No results were provided for the prejudging round, with only the top six advancing.

Cycling

Honduras qualified one male cyclist.

Road
Men

Mountain biking
Men

Equestrian

Honduras qualified two equestrians.

Dressage

Eventing

Football

Men's tournament

Honduras qualified a men's team of 18 athletes.

Roster
The 18-man squad was announced on 22 July 2019.

Group B

Semifinals

Gold medal match

Judo

Honduras qualified one female judoka.

Women

Rowing

Honduras qualified one male rower.

Men

Shooting

Honduras qualified two female sport shooters.

Women

Swimming

Honduras qualified seven swimmers (three men and four women).

Men

Women

Table tennis

Honduras qualified one male table tennis athlete. José You qualified at the individual qualification tournament by winning his side of the bracket of the first draw. You lived in trained in Taiwan for the last 20 years.

Men

Taekwondo

Honduras qualified three taekwondo practitioners (one man and two women).

Kyorugi

Tennis

Honduras qualified two male tennis players.

Men

Weightlifting

Honduras received a wild card for a male weightlifter.

Men

Wrestling

Honduras qualified two wrestlers (one man and one woman).

References

Nations at the 2019 Pan American Games
2019
2019 in Honduran sport